Nafrathuvumun is a 2019 Maldivian romantic film written and directed by Yoosuf Shafeeu. Produced by Shafeeu under Eupe Productions, the film stars Mariyam Azza, Ali Azim, Ahmed Easa and Yoosuf Shafeeu in pivotal roles. The film was released on 9 April 2019.

Premise
Reesha (Mariyam Azza), a wealthy businesswoman goes bankrupt and is strongly determined not to sell her guesthouse, though her husband Lamiu (Ahmed Easa) continuously persuade her to sell the property. Convinced by her friend, Maaniu (Yoosuf Shafeeu), Reesha agrees to rent the guesthouse for a long term to Shamin (Ali Azim). Unintentionally, Reesha grows closer to Shamin and seeks divorce from Lamiu.

Cast 
 Yoosuf Shafeeu as Maaniu
 Mariyam Azza as Reesha
 Ali Azim as Shamin
 Ahmed Easa as Lamiu
 Ahmed Saeed as Zameer
 Hussain Nasif as a gang member
 Assam Ahmed as a gang member

Development
The project was announced on 5 September 2018 in an event held to celebrate V Media's tenth anniversary. In December 2018, reports revealed that the film will star Mariyam Azza, Ali Azim and Ahmed Easa in the lead roles while Shafeeu will star in a supporting role. Filming took place in B. Dharavandhoo simultaneously with another project, Dhauvath (2019) which was also directed by Shafeeu and starring Azza, Azim and Easa in the main roles. Filming was completed in late December 2018. The release date of the film was announced to be 9 April 2019.

Soundtrack

Release and response
The teaser trailer of the film was released on 1 March 2019 while the official trailer was released on 3 April 2019. The film was released on 9 April 2019. The film released mixed to positive reviews from critics. Mariyam Waheedha from Miadhu Daily wrote: "In an event of twists and turns and powerful performances, the film succeeds in grabbing the attention of the audience in its right way ". Ifraz Ali from Dho? chose the film among the best five films released during the year and noted: "The film revolving around love and revenge, the director has chosen a different yet engaging concept, but fails to bring the best from actors".

References

2019 films
Maldivian romantic drama films
Films directed by Yoosuf Shafeeu